Indirect presidential elections were held in Burundi on 19 August 2005. Members of the National Assembly and Senate chose the new president of the republic for a five-year term. The sole candidate, Pierre Nkurunziza of the CNDD–FDD, was elected by a vote of 151–9. Nkurunziza was sworn in on 26 August 2005.

Electoral system
The election was held using the multiple round system. In order to win in the first round of voting, Nkurunziza was required to receive at least two-thirds of the vote (108 votes).

Results

References

Presidential elections in Burundi
Burundi
2005 in Burundi